Lotfi Rabah Madjer (born 22 March 2002), is an Algerian-born Qatari professional footballer who plays as a forward for Qatar Stars League side Al-Duhail and the Qatar national under-23 team.

Career
Madjer started his career at Al-Duhail. On 22 November 2020, Madjer made his professional debut for Al-Duhail against Al-Gharafa in the Pro League, replacing Mohammed Muntari .

Personal life
Madjer is the son of the former Algeria national team footballer Rabah Madjer

Career statistics

Club

Notes

References

External links

2002 births
Living people
Algerian footballers
Qatari footballers
Qatar youth international footballers
Qatari people of Algerian descent
Naturalised citizens of Qatar
Association football forwards
Paradou AC players
Al-Duhail SC players
Qatar Stars League players
Qatar under-20 international footballers